Kevin Smith (born 1970) is an American filmmaker, actor and comedian

Kevin Smith may also refer to:

Sports

American football
Kevin Smith (tight end) (born 1969), American football player for the Los Angeles Raiders and the Green Bay Packers
Kevin Smith (cornerback) (born 1970), American football player for the Dallas Cowboys
Kevin Smith (running back) (born 1986), American football player
Kevin Smith (wide receiver) (born 1991), American football wide receiver

Australian rules football
Kevin R. Smith (1932–1991), Australian rules footballer for North Melbourne and Footscray
Kevin J. Smith (born 1934), Australian rules footballer for Footscray
Kevin Smith (footballer, born 1942) (1942–2003), Australian rules footballer for Richmond

Other sports
Kevin Smith (sailor) (born 1957), Canadian Olympic sailor
Kevin Smith (cricketer) (born 1957), English cricketer
Kevin Smith (canoeist) (born 1961), British sprint canoer
Kevin Smith (speedway rider) (born 1961), English speedway rider
Kevin Smith (footballer, born 1987), Scottish football player
Kevin Smith (soccer) (fl. 1990s), American soccer player
Kevin Smith (baseball) (born 1996), American baseball player
Kevin Smith (pitcher) (born 1997), American baseball player

Entertainment
Kevin Max (Kevin Max Smith, born 1967), American singer and member of dc Talk
Kevin Smith (musician) (born 1956), American keyboardist
Kevin Smith (New Zealand actor) (1963–2002), New Zealand actor best known for playing Ares on Xena: Warrior Princess
Kevin Smith (Australian actor) (1953–2005), Australian stage actor
Kevin Smith (South African actor), South African actor best known for playing Frank Xavier on Isidingo
Lovebug Starski (Kevin Smith, 1960-2018), American rapper
Kojaque (Kevin Smith, born 1995), Irish rapper

Other people
Kevin Smith (businessman) (born 1954), British businessman
Kevin Smith (conservationist) (1953–2005), New Zealand conservationist
Kevin Smith (editor), British science fiction editor and activist
Kevin H. Smith (born 1977), former New Hampshire state legislator

See also
Kevin Smyth, Canadian ice hockey player
Kevin Smyth (rugby league), Australian rugby league player